Carlos Ertel also known as Menta (born 18 December 1974) is a Brazilian handball player who competed in the 1996 Summer Olympics and in the 2008 Summer Olympics.

References

1974 births
Living people
Brazilian male handball players
Olympic handball players of Brazil
Handball players at the 1996 Summer Olympics
Handball players at the 2008 Summer Olympics
People from Canoas
Handball players at the 2007 Pan American Games
Pan American Games medalists in handball
Pan American Games gold medalists for Brazil
Medalists at the 2007 Pan American Games
Sportspeople from Rio Grande do Sul
21st-century Brazilian people